Otter Lake is located by Otter Lake, New York southeast of McKeever, New York. Fish species present in the lake are largemouth bass, white sucker, rock bass, yellow perch, smallmouth bass, and black bullhead. There is trail access from Long Lake on the southwest shore of Otter Lake.

References 

Lakes of Oneida County, New York
Lakes of New York (state)